The United States Department of Defense held a total of nine British detainees at Guantanamo Bay detention camp. An additional nine detainees were citizens of other nations who had been granted permanent residency status in the United Kingdom.

A total of 778 suspects have been held in the Guantanamo Bay detention camps, in Cuba since the camps opened on January 11, 2002. The camp population peaked in 2004 at approximately 660.  Only nineteen new suspects, all "high value detainees" have been transferred there since the United States Supreme Court's ruling in Rasul v. Bush.  

Five British citizens were repatriated in March 2004, including friends known as the Tipton Three, prior to the start of the Combatant Status Review Tribunals. Shafiq Rasul had been party to a major court challenge under a habeas corpus petition challenging his detention. In Rasul v. Bush (2004), the US Supreme Court ruled that detainees had the right to challenge their detention before an impartial tribunal, one of the first of several landmark cases related to operations at Guantanamo.

All British citizens and residents have been repatriated from Guantanamo. Shaker Aamer was the last British resident to be released, landing on British soil on October 30, 2015.

British citizens held at Guantanamo Bay

References

External links
 "Guantánamo Bay files: Profiles of the 10 released British prisoners", Ian Cobain, The Guardian, April 25, 2011

Lists of Guantanamo Bay detainees by nationality
United Kingdom–United States relations